Laxman Utekar is an Indian filmmaker, cinematographer and director known for his work in Hindi and Marathi films.

Utekar started his career as a director of photography in Hindi cinema with films such as English Vinglish and Dear Zindagi. He made his directorial debut in 2013 with Tapaal. He went on to direct the romantic comedy Luka Chuppi (2019) and the drama Mimi (2021).

Career
Utekar started his career as a director of photography in Hindi cinema in 2007 with Khanna & Iyer. He then went on to work on English Vinglish, Dear Zindagi, Hindi Medium and 102 Not Out. He made his directorial debut in 2013 with Marathi film Tapaal. He then directed Lalbaugchi Rani (2016), a slice of life drama about a mentally challenged girl who gets lost in Mumbai.

Utekar first Hindi film as director was the romantic comedy Luka Chuppi (2019) which starred Kartik Aaryan and Kriti Sanon as a couple in a live in relationship and the chaos ensues when their traditional families assume them to be married to each other.

In 2021, Utekar directed and co-wrote with Rohan Shankar the drama Mimi. A remake of the Marathi film Mala Aai Vhhaychy! (2011). the film reunited him with Sanon, in the titular role of a young woman who opts to be a surrogate mother for a foreign couple. Following the non-existent theatrical releases due to COVID-19 pandemic, the film was released through the streaming services Netflix and JioCinema. The film received positive reviews from critics, with Renuka Vyahare of The Times of India nothing that "it picks a relevant topic and turns it into an engaging, empowering and compassionate tale on humanity and motherhood".  Taran Adarsh wrote, “Mimi is a heartwarming saga, aimed at families and it will keep the audience thoroughly entertained.”

Filmography

References

External links

Cinematographers from Maharashtra
Hindi-language film directors
21st-century Indian film directors
Living people
Year of birth missing (living people)

He started life selling vada pao in mumbai. His cart was confiscated by BMC and then he got a job as a peon in an editing studio.